This was the first edition of the tournament.

Anna Karolína Schmiedlová won the title, defeating Arantxa Rus in the final, 6–3, 6–3.

Seeds

Draw

Finals

Top half

Bottom half

Qualifying

Seeds

Qualifiers

Draw

First qualifier

Second qualifier

Third qualifier

Fourth qualifier

External Links

Main Draw
Qualifying Draw

Belgrade Challenger - Women's Singles